KA Tun Azizan is an auxiliary ship currently in service with Royal Malaysian Navy (RMN). She was sponsored by local company Petroliam Nasional Berhad (PETRONAS) and transferred from Malaysia International Shipping Corporation Berhad (MISC) to the RMN. Malaysia Marine and Heavy Engineering (MMHE) then change and modify a used cargo vessel to be used as a forward operation base operated by the Royal Malaysian Navy in Sulu Sea, Lahad Datu, Sabah to support the operation of the Eastern Sabah Security Command (ESSCOM). Since its operation in July 2015, KA TAZ operated under the Malaysian International Shipping Corporation (MISC) with the appointment of commanding officers absorbed as member of the RMN Volunteer Reserve Team.

History 
Petronas, together with MISC Bhd and Malaysia Marine Heavy Engineering (MMHE), has converted Tun Azizan, a cargo vessel, into a mobile sea base ship with the necessity features to function as a long-term national security asset.
In November 2014, Petronas led an initiative jointly with MMHE and MISC to convert a used cargo vessel for the Royal Malaysian Navy's use as a mobile forward operating base in Sabah. This facilities are the first in Malaysia and Southeast Asia. It can accommodate a total of 99 crew and is equipped with accommodation, food storage, washing room, operating and communication room, powerhouse, air conditioning system as well as military equipment and infrastructure. Tun Azizan is also equipped with light canon and grenade launcher such as others Malaysian navy auxiliary ships, Bunga Mas Lima (BM5) and Bunga Mas Enam (BM6). All features and equipment have been fitted according to the technical requirements of the Malaysian Armed Forces (ATM).

References 

1999 ships
Auxiliary ships of the Royal Malaysian Navy
Ships built in Malaysia